Kabir Singh Toor (born 20 April 1990 in Watford, Hertfordshire) is an English cricketer who played for Middlesex.

Toor was educated at the St. John's Preparatory School in Northwood before he moved on to the John Lyon School, Harrow and attended the Middlesex Cricket Academy. He represented Middlesex, South England and England at all major levels until 18. After a strong pre-season performance during the tour to Dubai in 2009, he went on to make his professional debut in a Pro40 match in September of that year.

External links
 Profile at Middlesex County Cricket Club
 

1990 births
Living people
English cricketers
Middlesex cricketers
People educated at The John Lyon School
Hertfordshire cricketers